This is a list of films produced by the Bollywood film industry based in Mumbai in 2005.

Top-earning films
The top 10 highest worldwide grossing Bollywood films of 2005 are as follows:

2005

References

2005
Lists of 2005 films by country or language
2005 in Indian cinema